See Maghrebi Jews for more information about Jews in the rest of North Africa.

Mashriqi Jews refers to Jews from the Arab Mashriq region that covers parts of North Africa and Western Asia. This would include the following:

 History of the Jews in the Arabian Peninsula.
 History of the Jews in Bahrain.
 History of the Jews in Egypt.
 History of the Jews in Iraq.
 History of Israel (the only majority non-Arab country in the Mashriq).
 History of the Jews and Judaism in the Land of Israel.
 History of the Jews in Jordan.
 History of the Jews in Kuwait.
 History of the Jews in Lebanon.
 History of the Jews in Oman.
 History of the Jews in Qatar.
 History of the Jews in Saudi Arabia.
 History of the Jews in Sudan.
 History of the Jews in Syria.
 History of the Jews in the United Arab Emirates.
 History of the Jews in Yemen.

See also

 Jews
 Maghrebi Jews
 Sephardi Jews
 Mizrahi Jews
 Berber Jews
 Moroccan Jews
 Adeni Jews
 Yemenite Jews
 Eastern Sephardim
 North African Sephardim
 Spanish and Portuguese Jews
 Jewish ethnic divisions
 Ashkenazi Jews
 Hebrews
 Israelites
 Palestinian Jews
 Israeli Jews